('wooden person', from Mapuche  'people' and  'wood') are Mapuche statues made of wood used to signal the grave of a deceased person.

Description

Statues may have male or female features. The Mapuche used whole logs of either Nothofagus obliqua, a hardwood, or laurel for their .

The Mapuche made  in pre-Columbian times in a manner similar to headstones. According to testimony in books,  helped the deceased's soul reunite with its ancestors. This sculpture stood by the deceased during the funeral and was then erected over the grave.

References

External links
 Chemamüll images in Precolumbian museum, in Spanish
 Weblog in Spanish about chemamüll

Mapuche culture
Wooden sculptures
Death customs